Scapozygocera ochreifrons is a species of beetle in the family Cerambycidae. It was described by Stephan von Breuning in 1965.

References

Zygocerini
Beetles described in 1965